Taos or TAOS may refer to:

Places
 Taos, Missouri, a city in Cole County, Missouri, United States
 Taos County, New Mexico, United States
 Taos, New Mexico, a city, the county seat of Taos County, New Mexico
 Taos art colony, an art colony founded in Taos, New Mexico
 Taos Pueblo, a Native American pueblo
 Taos Pueblo, New Mexico, a census-designated place in Taos County, New Mexico
 Taos Ski Valley, New Mexico, a ski resort village in New Mexico

People and language
 Taos people, or the Tiwa people
 Taos language, a Tanoan language spoken in Taos Pueblo, New Mexico
 The subset of Puebloan peoples who speak the Taos language

Other
 Taiwanese–American Occultation Survey (TAOS)
 Taos, a sleeping car built by the Budd Company in 1938 for use on the Atchison, Topeka and Santa Fe Railway's passenger train, the Super Chief
 Taos Hum, a phenomenon involving a persistent and invasive low-frequency noise of a humming character and unknown origin
 Taos Revolt, a popular insurrection against the American occupation of New Mexico in 1847 during the Mexican–American War
 TAOS (operating system), later renamed to Intent.
 Technology for Autonomous Operational Survivability, a United States Air Force satellite
 Texas Advanced Optoelectronic Solutions, a semiconductor light sensor maker now owned by ams AG
 The Art of Shaking, an online educational platform
 Volkswagen Taos, a sport utility vehicle model

See also
 Tao (disambiguation)

Language and nationality disambiguation pages